Japanese Vietnamese or Vietnamese Japanese may refer to:
Japan–Vietnam relations
Japanese language education in Vietnam
Japanese people in Vietnam
Vietnamese people in Japan
Multiracial people of Japanese and Vietnamese descent